Egmont Prinz zur Lippe-Weißenfeld (14 July 1918 – 12 March 1944) was a Luftwaffe night fighter flying ace of royal descent during World War II. A flying ace or fighter ace is a military aviator credited with shooting down five or more enemy aircraft during aerial combat. Prinz zur Lippe-Weißenfeld was credited with 51 aerial victories, all of them claimed in nocturnal combat missions.

Prinz zur Lippe-Weißenfeld was born on 14 July 1918 in Salzburg, Austria and joined the infantry of the Austrian Bundesheer in 1936. He transferred to the emerging Luftwaffe, initially serving as a reconnaissance pilot in the Zerstörergeschwader 76 (ZG 76), before he transferred to the night fighter force. He claimed his first aerial victory on the night of 16 to 17 November 1940. By the end of March, he had accumulated 21 aerial victories for which he was awarded the Knight's Cross of the Iron Cross on 16 April 1942. He received the Knight's Cross of the Iron Cross with Oak Leaves on 2 August 1943, for 45 aerial victories. He was promoted to Major and tasked with leading Nachtjagdgeschwader 5 (NJG 5) in January 1944, before he and his crew were killed in a flight accident on 12 March 1944.

Personal life

Prince Egmont zur Lippe-Weißenfeld was born on 14 July 1918 in Salzburg, Austro-Hungarian Empire as a member of a cadet branch of the ruling House of Lippe. His father was Prince Alfred of Lippe-Weissenfeld (1881-1960) and his mother was born Countess Anna von Goëß (1895-1972). Egmont was the only son of four children. His sisters Carola, Sophie and Theodora were all younger than Egmont. They lived in an old castle in Upper Austria called Alt Wartenburg, which the family inherited through his mother. At birth he had a remote chance of succeeding to the throne of the Principality of Lippe, a small state within the German Empire. However, only months after his birth, Germany became a republic and all the German royal houses were forced to abdicate.

Prinz zur Lippe-Weißenfeld in his younger years was very enthusiastic about the mountains and wildlife. From his fourteenth year he participated in hunting. At the same time he was also very much interested in music and sports and discovered his love for flying at the Gaisberg near Salzburg. Here he attended the glider flying school of the Austrian Aëro Club. He attended a basic flying course with the second air regiment in Graz and Wiener Neustadt even before he joined the military service.

Prinz zur Lippe-Weißenfeld never married or had children. In January 1941 he became acquainted with Hannelore Ide, nicknamed Idelein. She was a secretary for a Luftgau. The two shared a close relationship and spent as much time together as the war permitted, listening to music and sailing on the IJsselmeer until his death in 1944.

Military service
Prinz zur Lippe-Weißenfeld joined the Austrian Bundesheer in 1936 at the age of 18, initially serving in the infantry.  In the aftermaths of the 1938 Anschluss, the incorporation of Austria into Greater Germany by Nazi Germany, he transferred to the German Luftwaffe and was promoted to Leutnant in 1939. He had earned his Luftwaffe Pilots Badge on 5 October 1938 and underwent further training at Fürstenfeldbruck, Schleißheim and Vienna-Aspern. His Luftwaffe career started with the II. Gruppe (2nd group) of the Zerstörergeschwader 76 (ZG 76) before he was transferred to the night fighter wing Nachtjagdgeschwader 1 (NJG 1) on 4 August 1940.  The unit was based at Gütersloh where he familiarised himself with the methods of the night fighters.

Night fighter career

Following the 1939 aerial Battle of the Heligoland Bight, Royal Air Force (RAF) attacks shifted to the cover of darkness, initiating the Defence of the Reich campaign. By mid-1940, Generalmajor (Brigadier General) Josef Kammhuber had established a night air defense system dubbed the Kammhuber Line. It consisted of a series of control sectors equipped with radars and searchlights and an associated night fighter. Each sector named a Himmelbett (canopy bed) would direct the night fighter into visual range with target bombers. In 1941, the Luftwaffe started equipping night fighters with airborne radar such as the Lichtenstein radar. This airborne radar did not come into general use until early 1942.

By the summer of 1940, the first night fighters were transferred to Leeuwarden in the Netherlands. Prinz zur Lippe-Weißenfeld was one of the pilots included in this small detachment. As early as 20 October 1940, he had taken over command of an independent night fighter commando at Schiphol and later at Bergen. On his first encounter with the Royal Air Force (RAF) bomber, in the night of 16 to 17 November 1940, he claimed a Vickers Wellington bomber from No. 115 Squadron RAF shot down at 02:05 hours. His second victory was claimed on the night of 15 January 1941, when he shot down an Armstrong Whitworth Whitley N1521 of the Linton-on-Ouse based No. 58 Squadron RAF over the northern Netherlands, near the Dutch coast in the Zwanenwater at a nature reserve at Callantsoog. He was wounded in action on 13 March 1941, while flying Bf 110 D-2 (Werknummer 3376 – factory number) of the 4./NJG 1 with his radio operator Josef Renette when he made an emergency landing at Bergen after their aircraft was hit by the defence fire, wounding them both. Shortly after midnight on 10 April 1941, Prinz zur Lippe-Weißenfeld claimed a No. 12 Squadron RAF Wellington over the IJsselmeer, raising NJG 1's victory score to 100. This achievement was celebrated at the Amstel Hotel in Amsterdam with General Kammhuber, Wolfgang Falck, Werner Streib, Helmut Lent and others attending. On 30 June 1941 while flying Bf 110 C-4 (Werknummer 3273) on a practice intercept mission over North Holland, he collided with Bf 110 C-7 (Werknummer 2075) piloted by Leutnant Rudolf Schoenert of the 4./NJG 1 and crashed near Bergen aan Zee. On 19 June 1941 he earned his first of four references in the daily Wehrmachtbericht, a daily bulletin from the Oberkommando der Wehrmacht (High Command of the Armed Forces).  By end July 1941, his number of aerial victory claims stood at eleven. Promoted to Oberleutnant he became Staffelkapitän of the 5th Staffel of Nachtjagdgeschwader 2 (NJG 2—2nd Night Fighter Wing) on 1 November 1941. By the end of 1941, he had claimed a total of 15 aerial victories.

He was awarded the German Cross in Gold on 25 January 1942 and the Knight's Cross of the Iron Cross on 16 April 1942 after he had shot down 4 RAF bombers in the night of 26 to 27 March 1942, his score standing at 21 aerial victories. Promoted to Hauptmann, Prinz zur Lippe-Weißenfeld was made Gruppenkommandeur of the I. Gruppe (1st group) of Nachtjagdgeschwader 3 (NJG 3—3rd Night Fighter Wing) on 15 October 1942, where he claimed two further aerial victories. He was transferred again, taking command of the III. Gruppe (3rd group) of NJG 1 on 11 June 1943. One month later he claimed his 45th aerial victory for which he was awarded the Knight's Cross of the Iron Cross with Oak Leaves on 2 August 1943. The presentation was made by Adolf Hitler at the Wolf's Lair, Hitler's headquarters in Rastenburg, present-day Kętrzyn in Poland on 10/11 August. Five other Luftwaffe officers were presented with awards that day by Hitler, Hauptmann Heinrich Ehrler, Oberleutnant Joachim Kirschner, Hauptmann Manfred Meurer, Hauptmann Werner Schröer, Oberleutnant Theodor Weissenberger were also awarded the Oak Leaves, and Major Helmut Lent received the Swords to his Knight's Cross with Oak Leaves.

Wing commander and death

After a one-month hospital stay, Prinz zur Lippe-Weißenfeld was promoted to Major and made Geschwaderkommodore of Nachtjagdgeschwader 5 (NJG 5—5th Night Fighter Wing) on 20 February 1944. He and his crew, Oberfeldwebel Josef Renette and Unteroffizier Kurt Röber, were killed in a flying accident on 12 March 1944 on a routine flight from Parchim to Athies-sous-Laon. Above Belgium, they seem to have encountered a bad weather zone with low clouds and a dense snowstorm and it was assumed that the aircraft hit the high Ardennes ground after being forced to fly lower because of ice forming on the wings. The exact circumstances of this flight may never be known, the Bf 110 G-4 C9+CD (Werknummer 720 010—factory number) crashed into the Ardennes mountains near St. Hubert where the completely burned-out wreck was found the following day. The funeral service was held in the city church of Linz on 15 March 1944. Prinz Egmont zur Lippe-Weißenfeld and Prinz Heinrich Prinz zu Sayn-Wittgenstein are buried side by side at Ysselsteyn in the Netherlands.

Summary of career

Aerial victory claims
According to Obermaier, Prinz zur Lippe-Weißenfeld was credited with 51 nocturnal aerial victories. Foreman, Mathews and Parry, authors of Luftwaffe Night Fighter Claims 1939 – 1945, list 50 nocturnal victory claims, numerically ranging from 1 to 50. His 49th claim is numerically labeled as his 59th victory. Mathews and Foreman also published Luftwaffe Aces — Biographies and Victory Claims, listing Prinz zur Lippe-Weißenfeld with 47 claims, plus four further unconfirmed claims.

Awards
Front Flying Clasp of the Luftwaffe in Gold
Iron Cross (1939)
 2nd Class (17 December 1940)
 1st Class (17 January 1941)
Wound Badge in Black
German Cross in Gold on 25 January 1942 as Oberleutnant in the 5./Nachtjagdgeschwader 2
 Knight's Cross of the Iron Cross with Oak Leaves
 Knight's Cross on 16 April 1942 as Oberleutnant and Staffelkapitän of the 5./Nachtjagdgeschwader 2
 263rd Oak Leaves on 2 August 1943  as Hauptmann and Gruppenkommandeur of the III./Nachtjagdgeschwader 1

Notes

References

Citations

Bibliography

 
 
 
 
 
 
 
 
 
 
 
 
 Scutts, Jerry (1998). German Night Fighter Aces of World War 2. Osprey Publishing. .
 
 
 
 
 
 
 
 
 
 
 
 
 
 
 
 
 

1918 births
1944 deaths
Austrian soldiers
Luftwaffe pilots
German World War II flying aces
Luftwaffe personnel killed in World War II
Recipients of the Gold German Cross
Recipients of the Knight's Cross of the Iron Cross with Oak Leaves
Aviators killed in aviation accidents or incidents
Military personnel from Salzburg
Egmont
Burials at Ysselsteyn German war cemetery